Jaroslav Škarvada (September 14, 1924 in Královské Vinohrady – June 14, 2010 in Prague) was the Catholic titular bishop of Litomyšl and auxiliary bishop of the Archdiocese of Prague, Czech Republic. 

Ordained to the priesthood on March 12, 1949, Škarvada was named bishop on December 18, 1982 and was ordained on January 6, 1983 retiring on September 25, 2002.

Notes

20th-century Roman Catholic bishops in the Czech Republic
1924 births
2010 deaths
Recipients of the Order of Tomáš Garrigue Masaryk
20th-century Roman Catholic titular bishops